The Cantonal Museum of Zoology is a zoology museum in the Palais de Rumine, Lausanne, Switzerland.

History 

The museums history dates from 1779, when the "objects" of natural history in the Académie de Lausanne were indexed by Daniel-Alexandre Chavannes.

In 1826, Chavannes vertebrate collection was purchased by  L'Etat de Vaud. The museum opened in the Académie de Lausanne in 1833. In 1886, the museum acquired 1,300 specimens bird specimens from  Albert Vouga (1829–1896), the author of Album Neuchâtelois. Vues historiques et pittoresques a book of landscape and natural history photography.

Important collections of later date include the ant collection of Auguste Forel and the insect collection of the then Director Jacques Aubert (1916–1995).

The museum moved to its present location Palais de Rumine in 1906.

Notes and references

See also 
 List of natural history museums

External links 

  Official website
  Page on the website of the City of Lausanne
 An Inventory of Major European Bird Collections

Natural history museums in Switzerland
Museums in Lausanne